Edgar Hernández (born 8 June 1977) is a male race walker from Mexico. He won the bronze medal in the 50 km distance at the 2001 World Championships in Edmonton.

Achievements

References

1977 births
Living people
Mexican male racewalkers
Athletes (track and field) at the 2004 Summer Olympics
Olympic athletes of Mexico
World Athletics Championships medalists
21st-century Mexican people